TaxAudit is the public brand name of American tax firm TaxResources, Inc., which specializes in tax representation for individuals and small businesses. TaxAudit helps to alleviate the tax burden taxpayers face by offering audit defense and tax debt relief assistance. TaxResources, Inc. was founded in 1988. The firm became the exclusive provider of Intuit Corporation's TurboTax Audit Defense in 1999. TaxAudit is the largest audit defense firm in the country.  They are headquartered in Folsom, California, with additional offices in Southern California.

Overview
TaxAudit is a membership organization that offers prepaid audit defense and representation services when a member receives an income tax audit. They also provide audit defense services for taxpayers who are not members and tax debt relief services.

TurboTax
Since 1999, TaxAudit has been the provider of TurboTax audit defense.

References

External links
Main Webpage
 Better Business Bureau
 Glassdoor

Accounting firms of the United States